The 1983–84 Duke Blue Devils men's basketball team represented Duke University. The head coach was Mike Krzyzewski and the team finished the season with an overall record of 24–10.

Roster

Schedule 

|-
!colspan=9 style=| Regular season

|-
!colspan=12 style=| ACC tournament

|-
!colspan=12 style=| NCAA tournament

References 

Duke Blue Devils men's basketball seasons
Duke
Duke
Duke Blue Devils men's basketball
Duke Blue Devils men's basketball